St Botolph's Chapel is located in Botesdale, Suffolk. Built as a chapel of ease for the parish church of St Mary's Church, Redgrave, it now serves as the parish church, since St Mary's was declared redundant in 2004. It is a Grade II* listed building.

The earliest reference to the chapel was in a court roll in 1338, but in  1470 the chapel was converted to a chantry using land and property left by John Sheriffe.

In 1547 the chapel passed to the Crown following the Dissolution of the Monasteries, and in 1576 the chapel building was converted to use as a grammar school founded by Sir Nicholas Bacon. It closed as a school in 1878, reverting to use as a chapel of ease in 1883.

References 

Church of England church buildings in Suffolk